Wireless DNC is a form of wireless data transfer, known as Direct Numerical Control, performed between a computer numerical control (CNC) machine and the computer controlling it. These are very widely used in the automobile, engineering, sheet metal and aeronautic industries. These machines are capable of producing different parts. For each type of part, a sequence of instructions is needed. This list of instructions is stored in a computer script, a computer file written in a programming language, such as G-code. This script is commonly referred to as a part program. When a part is to be produced this part program is uploaded to a CNC machine by RS-232 link.

Now this RS-232 link between a PC and CNC machine with software is called a DNC system.  In a typical machine shop floor, it is difficult to maintain the data cable. Hence wireless data transfer has come into existence. There are mainly two types of wireless hardware units available in the market. One is using Bluetooth technology, while the other uses Wi-Fi technology. 

In case of Bluetooth, generally one pair of Bluetooth devices is used. One gets plugged on a COM port of a PC or Laptop, and the other is connected to an RS-232 port of a CNC machine. The wireless link is established with the required driver software. Once this is established, the user can run their DNC software for data transfer. In most cases, the file is sent from a remote PC to a selected CNC machine.

In Wi-Fi technology, a wireless link is established between a device called wireless access point (generally near the PC) and a device called a wireless node, which is interfaced to the CNC machine. There is one access point and multiple nodes. Each wireless access point and wireless node has one IP address. This IP address must be of the same domain name as the PC. Thus a wireless Ethernet link is created. The wireless node has an RS-232 port, which is connected to an RS-232 port of the CNC machine. Driver software on the PC maps the RS-232 port of the wireless node as a virtual COM port of the PC. Once this is done, the DNC software takes care of the two-way data transfer.

Industrial automation
Wireless networking